Chris Cozens (born 14 June 1982, in Bristol) is a freestyle swimmer from Great Britain.

Swimming career
He was a silver medallist in the 100 m freestyle (47.51) at the 2003 Summer Universiade in Daegu, South Korea. He studied at Loughborough University, and won the bronze medal in the 4×50 m freestyle relay at the 2005 European Short Course Championships in Trieste, Italy. Became the first British man under 48 seconds in the 100m Freestyle at the British Short Course Championships in Stockport 2003.

He is a two times winner of the British Championship in 100 metres freestyle (2003 and 2005).

References

External links
 

1982 births
Living people
English male freestyle swimmers
Sportspeople from Bristol
Alumni of Loughborough University
Swimmers at the 2006 Commonwealth Games
Universiade medalists in swimming
Universiade gold medalists for Great Britain
Universiade silver medalists for Great Britain
Medalists at the 2003 Summer Universiade
Medalists at the 2005 Summer Universiade
Commonwealth Games competitors for England